The 1931 season was the Hawthorn Football Club's 7th season in the Victorian Football League and 30th overall.

Schedule

Premiership season
Hawthorn played their round 7 and 8 games before their round 6 game due to round 6 being split with games played on either Monday, 8 June or Saturday, 27 June.

Ladder

References

Hawthorn Football Club seasons